This is a list of notable runologists.  Runologists are people who study runes and runic inscriptions.

Runologists 
 Elmer H. Antonsen (1929-2008), USA
 Erik Brate (1857–1924), Sweden
 Klaus Düwel (1935-2020), Germany
 Ralph Elliott (1921–2012), Australia
 Ottar Grønvik (1916–2008), Norway
 Daniel Henry Haigh (1819–1879), UK
 Lis Jacobsen (1882–1981), Denmark
 Sven B.F. Jansson (1906–1987), Sweden
 Wolfgang Krause (1895–1970), Germany
 Erik Moltke (1901–1984), Denmark
 R. I. Page (1924–2012), UK
 George Stephens (1813–1895), UK
 Ludvig Wimmer (1839–1920), Denmark

See also 
 List of runestones
 Lists of people by occupation

Lists of scientists by field
 
Runologists